Lloyd B. Carleton ( - August 8, 1933) was an American director, producer, and actor. Both of his parents were born in Virginia and Carleton's father, John T. Little Senior, supported the family as a clothing importer. The couple firstborn was John T. Little Jr born in 1868. Their last child Arthur W. Little, was born in 1878. The two older brothers graduated from  Columbia College with law degrees. John Jr would become one of New York's finest lawyers. Carleton briefly tried the legal profession but became driven by a bigger calling.

By 1900, he was acting on Broadway.  Soon he became involved with stage managing, production, stock players, and managing some of the theater's most significant names. During this time, Charles Frohman suggested he adopt the stage name of Lloyd B. Carleton. After a brief stint in Australia, a new visual media struck his fancy. Movies were continuing their upward spiral. After studying film-making techniques at the American Biograph studios, acting in a 1910 film,  he got a job directing movies at Thanhouser. He would continue to direct movies at Lubin, Selig, Universal, and Clermont Photoplays. He formed his own production company, Lloyd Carleton Productions, and used a variety of distributors.
The final curtain on his film endeavors ended in 1928. He moved back to New York.  He managed to act in one final broadway play before his death on August 8, 1933.

Theatrical plays

Complete filmography

References

See also
List of American films of 1910
List of American films of 1914
List of American films of 1915
List of American films of 1916
List of American films of 1920
List of American films of 1921
List of American films of 1923
List of American films of 1925
List of Film Booking Offices of America films

1872 births
1933 deaths
American male film actors
Film directors from New York City
American male silent film actors
20th-century American male actors
Silent film directors
Columbia College (New York) alumni